John Burniston was the Deputy Governor of Bombay from 1690 to 1704.

He left a widow named Carolina. One of their daughters was Sarah, wife of William Pownall and mother of Thomas Pownall, governor of Massachusetts Bay and South Carolina.

References

Year of birth missing
Year of death missing
Deputy Governors of Bombay